Halbert Township is one of six townships in Martin County, Indiana, United States. As of the 2010 census, its population was 1,631 and it contained 789 housing units.

Geography

Cities, towns, villages
 Shoals (east half)

Unincorporated towns
 Ironton at 
 Lacy at 
 Natchez at 
 Willow Valley at

Cemeteries
The township contains these five cemeteries: Acre, Baxter, Elliott, Hawkins and Union Chapel.

Major highways
  U.S. Route 50
  U.S. Route 150
  State Road 550

Lakes
 Deep Cut Lake

School districts
 Shoals Community School Corporation

Political districts
 Indiana's 8th congressional district
 State House District 62
 State House District 63
 State Senate District 48

References
 
 United States Census Bureau 2008 TIGER/Line Shapefiles
 IndianaMap

External links
 Indiana Township Association
 United Township Association of Indiana
 City-Data.com page for Halbert Township

Townships in Martin County, Indiana
Townships in Indiana